Cumnock railway station was a railway station serving the town of Cumnock, East Ayrshire, Scotland. The station was originally part of the Glasgow, Paisley, Kilmarnock and Ayr Railway. The former site of the station is now a care home. The station is located just off the A70 at Barrhill Road. This is near the Woodroad Viaduct.

History 
The station opened on 20 May 1850. The station was renamed to Cumnock on 10 January 1955, and closed to passengers on 6 December 1965.

Accidents and incidents
On 1 August 2015, a ballast train ran into the rear of another ballast train. Both trains were derailed.

References

Notes

Sources 
 
 

Disused railway stations in East Ayrshire
Railway stations in Great Britain opened in 1850
Railway stations in Great Britain closed in 1965
Beeching closures in Scotland
Former Glasgow and South Western Railway stations